The New England Open was the New England open golf tournament, open to both amateur and professional golfers. It is organized by the New England Section of the Professional Golfers' Association of America. It has been played annually since 1974 at a variety of courses around New England. It was cancelled in 2011 but returned in 2012.

Winners

2019 Jason Thresher
2018 Braden Shattuck
2017 Tournament canceled due to weather
2016 Jeff Curl
2015 James Driscoll
2014 Jesse Larson
2013 Kyle Gallo
2012 Rob Corcoran
2011 No tournament
2010 Jason Parajeckas
2009 Scott Spence
2008 Bob Kalinowski
2007 Geoff Sisk
2006 Geoff Sisk
2005 Ron Philo
2004 Rick Karbowski
2003 Rick Karbowski
2002 Todd Vernon
2001 Michael Simms
2000 Billy Downes
1999 Peter Morgan
1998 John Hickson
1997 Geoff Sisk
1996 Geoff Sisk
1995 Jeff Julian
1994 Brett Quigley
1993 Jeff Lewis
1992 Rich Parker
1991 Jeff Lewis
1990 Ted O'Rourke
1989 Jeff Lewis
1988 Jeff Bailey
1987 Andy Morse
1986 Andy Morse
1985 Bob Menne
1984 Tom Sutter
1983 Dana Quigley
1982 Jim Becker
1981 Dan Diskin
1980 Lee Danielian
1979 Paul Moran
1978 Tony Kaloustian
1977 Bill Mallon
1976 Bill Mallon
1975 Paul Barkhouse
1974 Harry Toscaco

External links
PGA New England Section
List of winners

1974 establishments in the United States
Golf in Connecticut
Golf in Maine
Golf in Massachusetts
Golf in New Hampshire
Golf in Rhode Island
Golf in Vermont
PGA of America sectional tournaments
Recurring sporting events established in 1974
Sports competitions in Connecticut
Sports competitions in Maine
Sports competitions in Massachusetts
Sports competitions in New Hampshire
Sports competitions in Rhode Island
Sports competitions in Vermont